The Chicago State Cougars men's basketball team represents Chicago State University in Chicago, Illinois, United States. The team currently competes as an independent and is led by second-year coach Gerald Gillion, who was hired on July 19, 2021. The Cougars play their home games at the Emil and Patricia Jones Convocation Center. The Cougars currently do not play in an NCAA Division I conference after departing from the WAC (Western Athletic Conference) in 2022.

The 2012–13 Cougars won the Great West Conference tournament championship to earn an automatic bid to the CollegeInsider.com Tournament.

Conference affiliations
 1966–67 to 1976–77 – NAIA Independent
 1977–78 to 1980–81 – Chicagoland Collegiate Athletic Conference
 1981–82 to 1982–84 – NAIA Independent
 1984–85 to 1992–93 – NCAA Division I Independent
 1993–94 East Coast Conference
 1994–95 to 2005–06 – Mid-Continent Conference
 2006–07 to 2008–09 – NCAA Division I Independent
 2009–10 to 2012–13 – Great West Conference
 2013–14 to 2021–22 – Western Athletic Conference
 2022–23 – Present NCAA Division I Independent

Postseason tournaments

NAIA Tournament results
The Cougars have appeared in three NAIA Tournaments. Their record is 5–3.

CIT results
The Cougars have appeared in one CollegeInsider.com Postseason Tournament (CIT). Their record is 0–1.

References

External links